Mocirla River may refer to the following rivers in Romania:

 Mocirla, a tributary of the Pârâul Beldii in Covasna County
 Mocirla, a tributary of the Beliu in Arad County

See also 
 Mocirla
 Mocirlele River